Potentilla reptans, known as the creeping cinquefoil,  European cinquefoil or creeping tormentil, is a flowering plant in the family Rosaceae.

A creeping perennial plant native to Eurasia and Northern Africa, Potentilla reptans has been naturalized elsewhere. Its trailing stems root at the nodes, and leaves are on long stalks. The plant blooms between June and August with yellow flowers that are about 2 cm in diameter and have five heart-shaped petals. P. reptans, which can be easily confused with silverweed, often grows in crushed masonry in the South of England. The grizzled skipper butterfly favors the plant.

Alcoholic extracts from roots of Potentilla reptans showed a moderate antimicrobial activity against common wound pathogens.

Potentilla reptans can be an invasive weed in lawns and flowerbeds and difficult to eradicate, particularly when it competes with and infests established groundcovers.  All of the taproots must be dug up, or the plant will reappear.

References

reptans
Flora of Europe
Flora of temperate Asia
Flora of North Africa
Medicinal plants
Plants described in 1753
Taxa named by Carl Linnaeus